The Book of Haggai is a book of the Hebrew Bible or Tanakh, and is the third-to-last of the Twelve Minor Prophets. It is a short book, consisting of only two chapters. The historical setting dates around 520 BC before the Temple had been rebuilt. The original text was written in Biblical Hebrew.

Authorship 

The Book of Haggai is named after the prophet Haggai whose prophecies are recorded in the book. The authorship of the book is uncertain. Some presume that Haggai wrote the book himself but he is repeatedly referred to in the third person which makes it unlikely that he wrote the text: it is more probable that the book was written by a disciple of Haggai who sought to preserve the content of Haggai's spoken prophecies.

There is no biographical information given about the prophet in the Book of Haggai.  Haggai's name is derived from the Hebrew verbal root hgg, which means "to make a pilgrimage."  W. Sibley Towner suggests that Haggai's name might come "from his single-minded effort to bring about the reconstruction of that destination of ancient Judean pilgrims, the Temple in Jerusalem."

Date 

The Book of Haggai records events in 520 BC, some 18 years after Cyrus had conquered Babylon and issued a decree in 538 BC, allowing the captive Judahites to return to Judea. Cyrus saw the restoration of the temple as necessary for the restoration of religious practices and a sense of peoplehood, after the long exile. The precise date of the written text is uncertain but most likely dates to within a generation of Haggai himself.

Early surviving manuscripts 

Some early manuscripts containing the text of this book in Biblical Hebrew are of the Masoretic Text, which includes the Codex Cairensis (895), the Petersburg Codex of the Prophets (916), and Codex Leningradensis (1008). Fragments of the Hebrew text of this book were found among the Dead Sea Scrolls, including 4Q77 (4QXIIb; 150–125 BCE) 4Q80 (4QXIIe; 75–50 BCE); and Wadi Murabba'at Minor Prophets (Mur88; MurXIIProph; 75-100 CE).

There is also a translation into Koine Greek known as the Septuagint, made in the last few centuries BCE. Extant ancient manuscripts of the Septuagint version include Codex Vaticanus (B; B; 4th century), Codex Sinaiticus (S; BHK: S; 4th century), Codex Alexandrinus (A; A; 5th century) and Codex Marchalianus (Q; Q; 6th century).

Synopsis 

Haggai's message is filled with an urgency for the people to proceed with the rebuilding of the second Jerusalem temple. Haggai attributes a recent drought to the people's refusal to rebuild the temple, which he sees as key to Jerusalem’s glory.  The book ends with the prediction of the downfall of kingdoms, with one Zerubbabel, governor of Judah, as the Lord's chosen leader. The language here is not as finely wrought as in some other books of the minor prophets, yet the intent seems straightforward.

The first chapter contains the first address (2–11) and its effects (12–15).

The second chapter contains:
The second prophecy (1–9), which was delivered a month after the first
The third prophecy (10–19), delivered two months and three days after the second; and
The fourth prophecy (20–23), delivered on the same day as the third

These discourses are referred to in Ezra 5:1 and 6:14. (Compare Haggai 2:7, 8 and 22)

Haggai reports that three weeks after his first prophecy the rebuilding of the Temple began on September 7 521 BC. "They came and began to work on the house of the LORD Almighty, their God, on the twenty-fourth day of the sixth month in the second year of Darius the King." (Haggai 1:14–15) and the Book of Ezra indicates that it was finished on February 25 516 BC "The Temple was completed on the third day of the month Adar, in the sixth year of the reign of King Darius." (Ezra 6:15)

Outline 

Divine Announcement: The Command to Rebuild the Temple 
Introduction: Reluctant Rebuilders 
Consider your ways: fruitless prosperity
Promise and Progress 
Divine Announcement: The Coming Glory of the Temple 
God will fulfill his promise 
Future Splendor of the temple
Divine Announcement: Blessings for a Defiled People 
Former Misery
Future Blessing
Divine Announcement: Zerubbabel Chosen as a Signet 

Music 
The King James Version of Haggai 2:6–7 is used in the libretto of the English-language oratorio "Messiah" by George Frideric Handel (HWV 56).

See also 
Darius I
Joshua the High Priest , son of Jehozadak
Old Testament messianic prophecies quoted in the New Testament

Notes

References

Works cited

External links 

Jewish translations:
 Chaggai – Haggai (Judaica Press) translation with Rashi's commentary at Chabad.org
Christian translations:
Online Bible at GospelHall.org (ESV, KJV, Darby, American Standard Version, Bible in Basic English)
  Various versions

 
6th-century BC books
Twelve Minor Prophets